The 1st King's Mounted Rifles were a light cavalry regiment of the Royal Prussian Army from 1901 to 1918. When the Imperial German Army was reorganized as the Reichsheer, 'A Squadron'/'10th Horse' became bearer of the regiment's tradition.

The 1st King's Mounted Rifles belonged to the V Army Corps and was garrisoned in Posen. When the regiment was mobilized in 1914 it formed 10th Cavalry Brigade. Colonel-in-Chief of the regiment was Wilhelm II, German Emperor who was also the King of Prussia, hence the title King's.

See also
List of Imperial German cavalry regiments

References

Mounted Rifles of the Prussian Army
Military units and formations established in 1901
1901 establishments in Germany